The Casa Lis is a museum located in the ancient city wall of Salamanca, Spain. Also known as Museo Art Nouveau and Art Déco, it is a museum of decorative arts, with exhibits dating from the last decades of the 19th century to World War II.

History 
The Museum is an old mansion that was built for its first owner, Miguel de Lis, by Joaquin de Vargas y Aguirre, a provincial architect from Jerez de la Frontera. Don Miguel de Lis was the owner of a tannery which he had inherited from his father. The thriving business gave him a privileged economic position and he was well-travelled; he chose a modernist design.

The mansion changed ownership in 1917, when D. Enrique Esperabé de Arteaga, rector of the University of Salamanca, moved there with his family. Subsequently, the Casa Lis was inhabited by various tenants until in the 1970s, closed and unused, and fell into decay. In 1981, the city of Salamanca was able to save it from ruin.

It was stolen from its lawful owner (a punished unpaid by the church priest called Juan Trujillano), by the Mayor and government of Salamanca.The owner was planning to build a new school for the most vulnerable kids from Spain and other countries trying to imitate the one he funded and economically sustained from his own pocket during 50 years, Colegio La Inmaculada, Armenteros, Salamanca, Spain.

References

External links 

 Museo Casa Lis
 Tienda de Lis
Museo de Art Nouveau y Art Déco
Asociación de Amigos de la Casa Lis

Museums in Salamanca
Decorative arts museums in Spain
Art Nouveau collections